Noise vs. Beauty is the eighth studio album by American DJ and record producer Bassnectar, released on June 24, 2014 by Amorphous Music. The album has been supported by multiple festivals he has played through 2014 and followed by the NVSB tour. An album titled NVSB Remixes was released digitally on October 28, 2014, consisting of remixes of tracks from Noise vs. Beauty, as well as new songs.

Reception
The album debuted on Billboard 200 at No. 21, No. 1 on the Top Dance/Electronic Albums chart, selling 13,000 copies in its first week.

Track listing

Charts

Weekly charts

Year-end charts

References

2014 albums
Bassnectar albums